Maitron is a French surname. Notable people with the surname include:

Jean Maitron (1910–1987), French historian
Julien Maitron (1881–1972), French road bicycle racer

See also
 Matron

French-language surnames